Natural Born Killer is the third solo album by American singer-songwriter Jason C. Miller. The album was released on July 3, 2012, by Count Mecha Music. Like his previous album Uncountry, this solo album features the single "You Get What You Pay For". The album contains eleven studio tracks, most of which have coauthors except for "I Saw the Light" written by Hank Williams.

Track listing

References

2012 albums
Jason C. Miller albums